Pietro Vinci (c. 1525 – after 14 June 1584) was an Italian composer of late Renaissance music.

Vinci was born in Nicosia. He was active in Bergamo and then in various Sicilian cities as Maestro di cappella. He published several books of madrigals and church music from 1561 to 1584.

References

External links
 
 file audio www.castellodisperlinga.it

1520s births
1584 deaths
People from Nicosia, Sicily
Italian classical composers
Italian male classical composers
16th-century Italian composers
Musicians from the Province of Enna